LOHAS Park is a Hong Kong seaside private residential development of the MTR Corporation. Overlooking Junk Bay, it is located in Tseung Kwan O Area 86, New Territories.

Name and concept
Formerly named "Dream City", it was renamed LOHAS Park. LOHAS is an acronym for "lifestyle of health and sustainability". The Chinese name means "sunrise health city". The CLP power substation for Phase I The Capitol retains the original name "Dream City Power Substation".

The MTR designated LOHAS Park an 'environmental protection city' when planning began in 2002. After the SARS epidemic in early 2003, the element of 'health' was incorporated. Following controversy over "wall effect" buildings in 2007, the developers promised there will be sufficient space to allow wind to circulate the estate.

The project

The  estate is divided into 13 phases, composing of 50 high-rise residential towers, offering 21,500 apartments to accommodate 58,000 residents in the site area, which are to be completed before 2025. These will sit above the MTR LOHAS Park station. The gross floor area (GFA) for domestic purposes is up to 1.6 million square metres, and retail GFA will occupy up to 50,000 m2

Apart from residential development, LOHAS Park will also include 3 shopping malls upon completion, including a 480,000-square-foot iconic MTR mall named THE LOHAS, which opened in 2020, it will contain the largest indoor ice-skating rink in Hong Kong and the largest cinema in the whole Tseung Kwan O town. There will also be green area of 1,000,000 square feet, including a 200,000-square-foot central park named The Park with pet recreation facilities, icon building, waterfalls and lawns.

Environmental features
1.4 million sq ft (40% of the site area) of common area with greenery: the common area will include a  park and a 330-metre seafront promenade.
 People and cars will be segregated – pedestrians can walk to various facilities without having to cross a road since all the places are linked with covered walkways.
The garden will be watered by a 440,000-litre water-recycling system.
LOHAS Park, itself on land reclaimed from the sea, is surrounded by land reclaimed as landfill. The large piece of greenery immediately to the north of LOHAS Park is the recovered land from the old Tseung Kwan O Stage I landfill which closed in 1995. The large mountain slope on the eastern side of LOHAS Park is the old Tseung Kwan O Stage II/III landfill which closed in 1994. According to an MTR spokesman, the landfill can no longer be smelled since the collection of domestic waste was halted in 2014.
SENT - The above landfills should not be confused with the operating South East New Territories (SENT) Landfill which is about 1 km southeast of LOHAS Park. The SENT is commonly called the Tseung Kwan O landfill in the media. The SENT was expected to become full in the financial year 2014/2015, if the decision to extend its coverage area was not granted.

Phases 

Phase I: The Capitol,
Phase II-A: Le Prestige,
Phase II-B: Le Prime,
Phase II-C: La Splendeur,
Phase III: Hemera,
Phase IV-A: Wings at Sea,
Phase IV-B: Wings at Sea II,
Phase V: Malibu,
Phase VI: LP6,
Phase VII-A: Montara,
Phase VII-B: Grand Montara,
Phase VIII: Sea to Sky,
Phase IX-A: Marini,
Phase IX-B: Grand Marini,
Phase IX-C: Ocean Marini,
Phase X: LP10,
Shopping Mall: THE LOHAS

The Capitol belongs to the Phase I of the development. It was jointly developed by Cheung Kong Holdings and MTR Corporation in 2008. It comprises 5 high-rise buildings up to 68 storeys, occupying  of floor area and offering 2,096 flats.

Phase II of the development was jointly developed by Cheung Kong Holdings and MTR Corporation and Nan Fung Development.

Le Prestige, Phase IIA (the first of three sub-phases of Phase II of the development) comprises four high-rise buildings up to 70 storeys, offering 1,688 flats and was completed in 2009.

Le Prime, Phase IIB (the second of three sub-phases of Phase II of the development) comprises three high-rise buildings up to 76 storeys, offering 1,416 flats and was completed in 2011.

La Splendeur, Phase IIC (the third of three sub-phases of Phase II of the development) comprises three high-rise buildings up to 72 storeys, offering 1,416 flats and was completed in 2013.
Phase II apartments facing East can enjoy the unrestricted view to the permanent recovered greenery. The planned new RTHK headquarters will lie between LOHAS Park Phase II and the greenery. The RTHK building headquarters will be only 10 storeys high compared to the 70+ storeys high of the LOHAS park Phase II towers.

Phase III was jointly developed by Cheung Kong Holdings, the MTR Corporation and Nan Fung Group. It is connected directly to LOHAS Park MTR station.

Hemera belongs to Phase III. It comprises 4 high-rise towers up to 66 storeys. The towers are named after various gemstones namely Diamond, Emerald, Amber and Topaz.

Phase IV is being jointly developed by Sun Hung Kai Properties and the MTR Corporation.
 
Wings at Sea belongs to Phase IV. It comprises two phases: Phase IVA is comprised off Towers 1 and 2 while Phase IVB also known as Wings at Sea II is comprised off Towers 3 and 5.

A new covered walkway is under construction which will offer direct access to the MTR station from the Wan Po Road. Currently, access to the LOHAS Park MTR station by other housing estates residents at the Northern side of the Wan Po Road need to pass through the Phase I.

According to the LOHAS Park master plan, Phase I and Phase II of LOHAS Park are furthest from the permanent sea front, as future phases are constructed, the current seaview apartments will have progressively less seaview.

In April 2015, the tender for LOHAS Park Package 4 was awarded to a subsidiary of Sun Hung Kai Properties. In November 2015, the tender for LOHAS Park Package 5 was awarded to a subsidiary of Wheelock & Co.

The LOHAS 

A shopping mall called The LOHAS is located in LOHAS Park. It opened on 23 August 2020. The mall will also be connected to Phase VIIA: Montara.There is an Ice rink, a supermarket named Fresh and a way to go to the MTR

Covid Pandemic
Tower 9 of La Splendeur was put under lockdown on 19 March 2021.

See also
 LOHAS Park station
 Tseung Kwan O New Town
 Tseung Kwan O line

References

External links 

Populated places established in the 2000s
Phase 1-3
Phase 1-3,6
Phase 4
Phase 5
MTR Corporation
Private housing estates in Hong Kong
Tseung Kwan O